Tubifex tubifex, also called the sludge worm, "Boogie Worm", or sewage worm, is a species of tubificid segmented worm which inhabits the sediments of lakes and rivers on several continents. Tubifex probably includes several species, but distinguishing between them is difficult because the reproductive organs, commonly used in species identification, are resorbed after mating, and because the external characteristics of the worm vary with changes in salinity. These worms ingest sediments, selectively digest bacteria, and absorb molecules through their body walls. 
Micro-plastic ingestion by Tubifex worms acts as a significant risk for trophic transfer and biomagnification of microplastics up the aquatic food chain. The worms can survive with little oxygen by waving hemoglobin-rich tail ends to exploit all available oxygen, and can exchange carbon dioxide and oxygen through their thin skins, in a manner similar to frogs. They can also survive in areas heavily polluted with organic matter that almost no other species can endure. By forming a protective cyst and lowering its metabolic rate, T. tubifex can survive drought and food shortage. Encystment may also function in the dispersal of the worm.
They usually inhabit the bottom sediments of lakes, rivers, and occasionally sewer lines and outlets.

References

Tubificina
Animals described in 1774
Taxa named by Otto Friedrich Müller